"All in the Way" is a song by the band Earth, Wind & Fire featuring the Emotions, released as a single in 2003 on Kalimba Music. The single peaked at No. 13 on the Billboard Adult R&B Songs chart and No. 25 on the Billboard Adult Contemporary Songs chart.

Overview
"All in the Way" was produced by Maurice White who also composed the song with Wayne Vaughn, Wanda Vaughn and Wendi Vaughn. The song also came upon EWF's 2003 studio album The Promise.

Critical reception
People described All in the Way as a "funky, finger-popping mid-tempo number". David Peschek of The Guardian also described the song as "effortlessly feelgood".

Chart positions

References

2003 singles
Earth, Wind & Fire songs
Songs written by Maurice White
2003 songs
Song recordings produced by Maurice White